Allen Thatcher (17 April 1899 – 12 February 1932) was an Australian cricketer. He played three first-class matches for New South Wales between 1920/21 and 1923/24.

See also
 List of New South Wales representative cricketers

References

External links
 

1899 births
1932 deaths
Australian cricketers
New South Wales cricketers
Cricketers from Sydney